Tamás Szőnyi (born July 23, 1957, Budapest) is a Hungarian mathematician, doing research in discrete mathematics, particularly finite geometry and algebraic coding theory. He is full professor at the Department of Computer Science of the Eötvös Loránd University, Budapest, vice director of the Institute of Mathematics, and vice chairman of the Mathematical Committee of the Hungarian Academy of Sciences. In 2001, he received the Doctor of Science title from the Hungarian Academy of Sciences. Szőnyi created a successful school in finite geometry. He has done influential work on blocking sets 
and the polynomial method.

Notes

External links
 Homepage of Tamás Szőnyi
 page of the finite geometry research group
 members of the mathematical committee of the HAS

1957 births
Living people
20th-century Hungarian mathematicians
21st-century Hungarian mathematicians
Combinatorialists